The Broxbourne Council election, 1991 was held to elect council members of the Broxbourne Borough Council, the local government authority of the borough of Broxbourne, Hertfordshire, England.

Composition of expiring seats before election

Election results

Results summary 

An election was held in 14 wards on 2 May 1991.

16 council seats were contested (2 seats in Bury Green Ward & 2 seats in Cheshunt Central Ward)

The Liberal Democrats gained 1 seat from the Conservatives in Rosedale Ward.

The Conservative Party gained a seat from the Labour Party in Bury Green Ward

Conservative 35 seats
Labour 5 seats
Liberal Democrats 2 Seats

Ward results

References

1991
1991 English local elections
1990s in Hertfordshire